Törökszentmiklós is a district in central part of Jász-Nagykun-Szolnok County. Törökszentmiklós is also the name of the town where the district seat is found. The district is located in the Northern Great Plain Statistical Region. This district is a part of Nagykunság historical and geographical region.

Geography 
Törökszentmiklós District borders with Kunhegyes District to the north, Karcag District to the east, Mezőtúr District to the southeast, Szolnok District to the west and north. The number of the inhabited places in Törökszentmiklós District is 7.

Municipalities 
The district has 2 towns and 5 villages.
(ordered by population, as of 1 January 2012)

The bolded municipalities are cities.

Demographics

In 2011, it had a population of 36,739 and the population density was 79/km².

Ethnicity
Besides the Hungarian majority, the main minorities are the Roma (approx. 1,500) and German (100).

Total population (2011 census): 36,739
Ethnic groups (2011 census): Identified themselves: 33,338 persons:
Hungarians: 31,779 (95.32%)
Gypsies: 1,208 (3.62%)
Others and indefinable: 351 (1.05%)
Approx. 3,500 persons in Törökszentmiklós District did not declare their ethnic group at the 2011 census.

Religion
Religious adherence in the county according to 2011 census:

Catholic – 10,728 (Roman Catholic – 10,655; Greek Catholic – 73);
Reformed – 3,780;
Evangelical – 49; 
other religions – 301; 
Non-religious – 12,179; 
Atheism – 310;
Undeclared – 9,392.

Gallery

See also
List of cities and towns of Hungary

References

External links
 Postal codes of the Törökszentmiklós District

Districts in Jász-Nagykun-Szolnok County